Adriaan Kluit (9 February 1735 – 12 January 1807) was a Dutch scholar, important in Dutch linguistics. He was born in Dordrecht. He was rector of the Latin school in Alkmaar and Middelburg. In 1779 he became the professor of history at the University of Leiden, remaining there until his death.

In the latter, Kluit examined the origins of the states of Holland and their position from the Middle Ages until 1795 – he concluded that the states was not sovereign, but its  (lord) was.

Major works
  (Utrecht 1773).
  2 Vols. (Middelburg 1777–1784); (Vol. 1); (Vol. 2).
  (Leiden 1779).(Online)
  (Leiden 1780) (Online)
  (Leiden 1784/1787).
  (Leiden 1785/1788).
  3 Vols. (Leiden 1790–1791); (Vol. 1); (Vol. 2); (Vol. 3)
  (Leiden 1790) (Online).
  (Amsterdam 1793) (Online).
  (Amsterdam 1794) (Online).
  5 Vols. (Amsterdam 1802–1805); (Vol. 1); (Vol. 2); (Vol. 3); (Vol. 4); (Vol. 5).

Bibliography
 Koen Stapelbroek, Ida H. Stamhuis & Paul M.M. Klep, 'Adriaan Kluit's statistics and the future of the Dutch state from a European perspective', History of European Ideas 36(2) (2010) 217–235.
 Igor van de Built,  (Amsterdam 2009).
 Wyger Velema, 'Contemporary Reactions to Patriot Political Discourse', in idem, Republicans: Essays on Eighteenth-century Dutch Political Thought (Boston 2007).
 Ivo Schöffer, '', Afscheidscollege Rijksuniversiteit Leiden (Leiden 1988).
 Theo Veen, '', Bijdragen en Mededelingen betreffende de Geschiedenis der Nederlanden 97 (Den Haag 1982) 185–215.
 F.W.N. Hugenholtz, '', in P.A.M. Geurts en A.E.M. Jansen (red.), Geschiedschrijving in Nederland (Den Haag 1981) 143–164.
 A.Th. van Deursen, '' in: P.A.M. Geurts & A.E.M. Janssen (red.), Geschiedschrijving in Nederland (Den Haag, 1971/1981).
 E.V. Vrij, '', Leids Jaarboekje 63 (1971) 121–142.
 Otto van Rees, '', Tijdschrift voor Staathuishoudkunde en statistiek 12 (1855) 245–262.

1735 births
1807 deaths
18th-century Dutch historians
Linguists from the Netherlands
18th-century Dutch educators
Academic staff of Leiden University
Utrecht University alumni
People from Dordrecht
19th-century Dutch historians